The slipstream genre is a term denoting forms of speculative fiction that do not remain in conventional boundaries of genre and narrative, directly extending from the experimentation of the New Wave science fiction movement while also borrowing from fantasy, psychological fiction, philosophical fiction and other genres or styles of literature.

Origin 
The term was invented by Richard Dorsett according to an interview with renowned cyberpunk author Bruce Sterling in Mythaxis Review. He said:

It was invented by my friend the late Richard Dorsett while the two of us were discussing a category of non-genre fantasy books that we had no name for. "They're certainly not mainstream," I said, and "Why not slipstream?" he suggested, and I thought it was a pretty good coinage.

Sterling later described it in an article originally published in SF Eye #5, in July 1989, as "a kind of writing which simply makes you feel very strange; the way that living in the twentieth century makes you feel, if you are a person of a certain sensibility." The Encyclopedia of Science Fiction credits Sterling with inventing the related term of "slipstream sf" for works that "make use of sf devices but which are not Genre SF".

Concept 
Slipstream fiction has been described as "the fiction of strangeness", or a form of writing that makes "the familiar strange or the strange familiar" through skepticism about elements of reality. Illustrating this, prototypes of the style of slipstream are considered to exist in the stories of Franz Kafka and Jorge Luis Borges.

Science fiction authors James Patrick Kelly and John Kessel, editors of Feeling Very Strange: The Slipstream Anthology, argued cognitive dissonance is at the heart of slipstream, and it is not so much a genre as a literary effect, like horror or comedy. Similarly, Christopher Priest, in his introduction to Anna Kavan's genre-defying but arguably slipstream novel Ice, writes "the best way to understand slipstream is to think of it as a state of mind or a particular approach, one that is outside of all categorisation. ... slipstream induces a sense of 'otherness' in the audience, like a glimpse into a distorting mirror."

Characteristics 
In slipstream, characteristics of works of fiction considered under the term include disruption of the principle of realism, avoidance of being a traditional fantasy story, and being a postmodern narrative. As an emerging genre, slipstream has been described as nonrealistic fiction with a postmodern sensibility, exploring an awareness of societal and technological change and psychological breakdown previously shown by science fiction authors during the time of postmodernism, as well as poets and experimental authors in modernism.

In her 2012 volume Walking the Clouds: An Anthology of Indigenous Science Fiction, Grace Dillon identified a current of Native American Slipstream that predates and anticipates the timeframe for slipstream, notably including Gerald Vizenor's 1978 short story "Custer on the Slipstream".

See also
 Bizarro fiction
 List of genres
 Magic realism
 New Weird
 Science fiction
 Speculative fiction
 Surrealism
 Transrealism (literature)

References

External resources
Bruce Sterling and Lawrence Person's combined slipstream list from Nova Express, Volume 5, Issue 2.
A Working Canon of Slipstream Writing  compiled in Readercon 18, 2007.
James Patrick Kelly covers slipstream in two of his "On the Net" columns from Asimov's Science Fiction: Slipstream and Genre.
A roundup of slipstream links, including links to commentary, discussions, and reviews of slipstream texts.
Fantastic Metropolis.com
Webpage on the special issue of Science-Fiction Studies discussing slipstream fiction. Table of Contents and article abstracts.
Slipstream (O de como la Ciencia Ficción ya no es Ciencia Ficción) [Slipstream (Or how Science Fiction is no longer Science Fiction)] (in Spanish).

Science fiction genres
Fantasy genres
Speculative fiction
1980s neologisms